Unichira is an area that is located in the Kalamassery municipality, Kerala, India. The Thrikkakkara Temple is situated very close to Unichira, and St. Jude church in Unichira itself.

References 

Ernakulam district